Murat Krym-Gerievich Khapsirokov (Russian: Мурат Крым-Гериевич Хапсироков; born 26 January 1978) is a Russian politician serving as a senator from the State Council of the Republic of Adygea since 1 October 2021.

Khapsirokov is under personal sanctions introduced by the European Union, the United Kingdom, the USA, Canada, Switzerland, Australia, Ukraine, and New Zealand, for ratifying the decisions of the "Treaty of Friendship, Cooperation and Mutual Assistance between the Russian Federation and the Donetsk People's Republic and between the Russian Federation and the Luhansk People’s Republic" and providing political and economic support for Russia's annexation of Ukrainian territories.

Early life

Khapsirokov was born on 26 January 1978 in the family of a local party leader. Since 1994, his father had been the head of the Administration of the General Prosecutor's Office of the Russian Federation. In 2000, Murat Khapsirokov graduated from the Kutafin Moscow State Law University.

Political career

In 2007, Murat Khapsirokov was appointed as head of the Permanent Mission of the Kabardino-Balkarian Republic under the President of the Russian Federation. From December 2008 to March 2011, he worked as a deputy of the premier minister of the Republic of Adygea Murat Kumpilov. In 2011 and 2016, he was elected as a deputy of the State Council of the Republic of Adygea from the United Russia party. On 8 February 2012, he became a member of the Federation Council. Since January 2020, he has served as Deputy Chairman of the Federation Council Committee on Rules and Organization of Parliamentary Activities.

References

Living people
1978 births
United Russia politicians
21st-century Russian politicians
People from Karachayevsky District
Members of the Federation Council of Russia (after 2000)